Sikri may refer to:

Places
 Sikri, Ballabhgarh, village in Ballabhgarh tehsil of Faridabad district in Haryana, India
 Sikri Khurd, village in Ghaziabad district, Uttar Pradesh, India
 Sikri Mata Temple
 Sikri metro station, Delhi Metro
 Sikri, Phagwara, village in Punjab, India
 Sikri, St. Kabir Nagar, village in Uttar Pradesh, India
 Sikri Vyas, village in Jalaun district, Uttar Pradesh, India
 Fatehgarh Sikri, village in Kapurthala district, Punjab, India
 Fatehpur Sikri, formerly Sikri, town in Agra district, Uttar Pradesh, India
 Fatehpur Sikri Assembly constituency
 Fatehpur Sikri Lok Sabha constituency
 Fatehpur Sikri railway station
 Battle of Fatehpur Sikri (1721)
 Jama Mosque, Fatehpur Sikri
 Panch Mahal, Fatehpur Sikri

People
 Arjan Kumar Sikri (born 1954), judge in the Supreme Court of India
 Sarv Mittra Sikri (1908–1992), 13th Chief Justice of India 
 Surekha Sikri (1945–2021), Indian actress

See also
 Fatehpur (disambiguation)
 Sikri stupa, Gandharan Buddhist artwork